The NCAA Women's Division III Indoor Track and Field Championship is an annual collegiate indoor track and field competition for women from Division III institutions organised by the National Collegiate Athletic Association. Athletes' performances in individual championships earn points for their institutions and the team with the most points receives the NCAA team title in track and field. A separate NCAA Division III men's competition is also held. These two events are separate from the NCAA Women's Division III Outdoor Track and Field Championships and NCAA Men's Division III Outdoor Track and Field Championships held during the spring. The first edition of the championship was held in 1983.

The current team champions are the Wisconsin–Oshkosh Titans; the Titans are also the most successful team, with 9 titles.

Events

Track events

Sprint events
60 meter dash
200 meter dash
400 meter dash
Distance events
800 meter run
Mile run
3,000 meter run
5,000 meter run
Hurdle Events
60 meter high hurdles
Relay events
1,600 meter relay
Distance medley relay

Field events

Jumping events
High jump
Pole vault
Long jump
Triple jump
Throwing events
Shot put
Weight throw
Multi-events
Pentathlon

Discontinued events

Sprint events
55 meter dash (1985–2011)
Distance events
1,500 meter run (1985–2004)
Hurdle Events
55 meter high hurdles (1985–2011)

Summary

Champions

Team titles
List updated through the 2023 Championships.

 Schools highlight in yellow have reclassified athletics from NCAA Division III.

Championship Records

See also
NCAA Women's Indoor Track and Field Championship (Division I, Division II)
NCAA Men's Indoor Track and Field Championship (Division I, Division II, Division III)
NCAA Women's Outdoor Track and Field Championship (Division I, Division II, Division III)
NCAA Men's Outdoor Track and Field Championship (Division I, Division II, Division III)

References

External links
NCAA Division III women's indoor track and field

 Indoor
NCAA women Division III
Recurring sporting events established in 1983
Women's athletics competitions